The McLaren GT Driver Academy, formerly known as McLaren GT Young Driver Programme is the programme launched by McLaren GT in 2015 to offer greater benefits to a larger pool of drivers who hold a range of different on-track experience.

Current drivers

Former drivers

See also
McLaren Young Driver Programme
McLaren Autosport BRDC Award

References

Racing schools
McLaren Group